The Educational Irish Research Satellite 1 or EIRSAT-1 mission was proposed in response to the European Space Agency (ESA) FYS2 (Fly Your Satellite System 2) call. The proposal was led by University College Dublin (UCD), in collaboration with Queen's University Belfast. The satellite project was one of six selected to go forward in the ESA FYS program in May 2017. The mission passed its PDR (Preliminary Design Review) with both institutions involved. Since CDR (Critical Design Review) in 2018, the mission has been developed and implemented by UCD with the support of ESA Education. The project aims to build, launch and operate the first Irish satellite in space. 

Among the Irish-based companies providing help are Réaltra, Real Time Technologies, EFJ Engineering, ENBIO and SensL.

Aims 
The mission of EIRSAT-1 is to advance education in space science and engineering across the whole island of Ireland through collaboration between student teams, higher education institutions and high-tech companies.

The objectives of EIRSAT-1 are to:
 develop the know-how of the Irish higher education sector in space science and engineering, by supporting student teams to build, test and operate the satellite;
 address skills shortages in the space sector by fostering collaboration between student teams and industry through the launch of three payloads that will demonstrate innovative Irish technology;
 inspire the next generation of students towards the study of STEM subjects by launching the very first Irish satellite.

Payloads 
EIRSAT-1 will carry three Irish developed experiments, or payloads.

GMOD - The Gamma-ray Module 
The first payload element (called the ‘Gamma-ray Module’ or ‘GMOD’) is a miniaturised sensor for use in the detection of gamma-rays from both cosmic and atmospheric phenomena. The sensor is called a silicon photomultiplier (SiPM) and has been developed by SensL Ltd. in Co. Cork (currently part of ON Semiconductor). The SiPM has the potential to revolutionise in-situ and remote sensing of gamma-rays in space by removing the need for conventional photomultiplier tubes that are typically very bulky, fragile and require high voltages to operate.

EMOD - the ENBIO Module 
The second payload element (called the ‘ENBIO Module’ or ‘EMOD’) will provide in-orbit demonstration of novel protective oxide surface treatments made by ENBIO Ltd. (SolarWhite and SolarBlack). These surface treatments have been developed for use on the ESA Solar Orbiter mission, and EIRSAT-1 will provide the opportunity for these coatings to be thermally tested. The temperature of the coatings will be measured throughout the mission.

WBC - Wave Based Control 
The third payload is a novel, software-based attitude control system developed by the Dynamics and Control Group in the UCD School of Mechanical and Materials Engineering. A spacecraft's “attitude” is its orientation in space. In this case it will use the Earth's magnetic field to turn itself in any desired direction. The UCD control technique is called “Wave-Based Control” (WBC). EIRSAT-1 will use a standard control system initially. At some time into the mission, in response to an instruction from Earth, the on-board computer will start using WBC to control the satellite's attitude, thereby evaluating its performance and, it is hoped, qualifying WBC for space flight.

Launch and operations 
Subject to successful reviews, the spacecraft will be delivered to ESA in 2022 and is scheduled to be launched in March 2023 on a Vega-C rocket as part of the Small Satellites Mission Service #5 rideshare mission.

Budget
The satellite will cost €1,500,000, which is funded jointly by the ESA, the Irish Research Council and Science Foundation Ireland.

Public presentations 
Lorraine Hanlon, EIRSAT-1 Endorsing Professor, introduced the project during a panel after the Irish premiere of the film "16 Levers de Soleil" on 31 January 2019. Scholarly publications have been published in numerous journals and at conferences.

References 

Satellites of Ireland
Science and technology in Ireland
University College Dublin
2023 in spaceflight
2023 in Ireland